ADMI may refer to: 

 Aspen Dental Management, Inc., a corporation providing dentistry and denture care
 The American Dye Manufacturers Institute
 The American Dry Milk Institute, which became the American Dairy Products Institute through a merger with the Whey Products Institute in 1986